Arne Novák, born as Arnošt Novák, (2 March 1880, Litomyšl, Bohemia – 26 November 1939, Polička) was a Czech literary historian and critic, specialist in German and Czech studies.

Life
He was born as a son of the high school teacher Josef Novák and the novelist Teréza Nováková.

He was active in the magazines Volné směry, Lumír, Rozhledy, etc.

See also

 List of Czech writers

References 
 Biography 
 Arne Novak Digital Library   - free scanned books

External links
 

1880 births
1939 deaths
People from Litomyšl
Czech male writers
Czechoslovak writers
Czech literary critics
Charles University alumni
Academic staff of Masaryk University
Czech literary historians